Marco Greco (Born December 1, 1963 in São Paulo) is a Brazilian former Grand Prix motorcycle road racer and auto racing driver who competed in the Indy Racing League from 1996 to 1999. His best finish in the season points was third in 1996–1997. He made four starts in the Indianapolis 500 with a best finish of 14th in 1998. He previously competed in the CART World Series in full seasons in 1993 for Sovereign Motorsports and in 1994 for Arciero Racing and partial seasons in 1995 and 1996 for Dick Simon Racing, Galles Racing, and Team Scandia.

Career results

Career summary

Grand Prix motorcycle racing

Races by year
(key) (Races in bold indicate pole position, races in italics indicate fastest lap)

Complete International Formula 3000 results
(key) (Races in bold indicate pole position) (Races 
in italics indicate fastest lap)

American Open Wheel
(key)

CART

IndyCar

Indy 500 results

Sources
Driver Database Profile

1963 births
Living people
Brazilian racing drivers
Brazilian motorcycle racers
500cc World Championship riders
Indianapolis 500 drivers
Brazilian Champ Car drivers
IndyCar Series drivers
Indy Lights drivers
British Formula Three Championship drivers
British Formula 3000 Championship drivers
International Formula 3000 drivers
Sportspeople from São Paulo
Brazilian IndyCar Series drivers
A. J. Foyt Enterprises drivers
TOM'S drivers